Fiqre Salassie Crockwell (8 July 1985 – 20 June 2016) was a Bermudian cricketer who represented the national team at One Day International level on two occasions, in April 2009. He was an opening batsman.

Crockwell's ODI appearances, along with three other matches which had List A but not ODI status, were all during Bermuda's unsuccessful 2009 ICC World Cup Qualifier campaign in South Africa. Crockwell's top score of 45 came in one of the ODIs, a match against Kenya.

Crockwell played Under-19 cricket for Bermuda and made his senior team debut as a 23-year-old at the 2009 World Cup Qualifier in South Africa. He opened the batting on debut, making 36 in a nine-wicket win over Denmark. His only two ODIs came against Kenya and Netherlands during the same tournament, where he made 45 and 23 respectively in a pair of losses.

His last appearance for Bermuda came at the 2012 World T20 Qualifier in the UAE. He made 117 runs in four matches in the tournament at 29.25, with a best of 47 in his final match for the national team, a win over Uganda. Crockwell was included in a preliminary squad that toured Jamaica ahead of last year's ICC Americas Division One Twenty20 championship in Indianapolis but was not included in the final 14-man group that finished third at the tournament.

Locally, Crockwell played for St. David's County Cricket Club and also played for St. George's on several occasions in the annual Cup Match holiday game played every summer, the biggest domestic match on the Bermuda cricket calendar dating back to 1872.

Crockwell's sporting relatives include FIFA-certified referee Carlyle McNeil Eugene Crockwell and footballer Mikkail Kristopher Crockwell.

On 20 June 2016, Crockwell was found dead in the Pembroke parish area of Bermuda. He was found fatally wounded shortly before 3 am.

References

External links

1985 births
2016 deaths
Bermudian cricketers
Bermuda One Day International cricketers
Deaths by firearm in Bermuda
People murdered in Bermuda
Bermudian murder victims
People from Pembroke Parish